Roy Miller High School is a public high school located in the city of Corpus Christi, Texas, United States and classified as a 5A school by the UIL. It is a part of the Corpus Christi Independent School District. The school was known as Corpus Christi High School until 1950. It is the oldest high school in the city.

History
Established in 1894, Roy Miller is the oldest high school in Corpus Christi. Originally known as Corpus Christi High, the school was renamed in 1950 in honor of Henry Pomeroy Miller, the former mayor Of Corpus Christi. Miller is a center for science and technology. The recently improved science and computer labs add to Miller's academic experience. In conjunction with Del Mar College, Miller offers a series of Dual-Credit academies which include: Cosmetology, Fire Science, and welding. In 2013, the school was rated "Met Standard" by the Texas Education Agency.

Athletics
The Miller Buccaneers compete in these sports: Volleyball, Cross Country, Football, Basketball, Soccer, Golf, Tennis, Track, Baseball & Softball

State titles
Boys Basketball 
1950(2A)
Football 
1938(All), 1960(4A)
Boys Track 
1947(All), 1949(2A)

Notable alumni
 Marshall Applewhite, founder of Heaven's Gate
 Jesse Benavides, WBO super bantamweight champion
 Dabney Coleman, actor
Pamelya Herndon, member of the New Mexico House of Representatives
 Edwin Kessler (1945), atmospheric scientist and Doppler weather radar pioneer
 Eva Longoria, actress
 Allen Ludden, host of TV game show Password
 Abraham Quintanilla, Jr., singer, father of Selena
 Johnny Roland, football player and coach

References

External links
Corpus Christi ISD

Corpus Christi Independent School District high schools
Educational institutions established in 1894
High schools in Corpus Christi, Texas
1894 establishments in Texas